There are two places named Randolph in the U.S. state of New York:

Randolph (town), New York
Randolph (village), New York

See also
East Randolph, New York